This is a list of units of the British Army's Royal Engineers.

Groups

Division
 1
 2nd Armoured Division Engineer Regiment 23 Engr Regt and 25 Engr Regt amalgamated to form 2 Armd Div Engr Regt, September 1976. Based at Roberts Barracks, Osnabruck, served two tours in Northern Ireland; redesignated 25 Engineer Regiment in 1982.
 4
 7 Armoured

Establishment

 1 Engineer Training became 21 Field Engineer Regiment

Brigades & Groups

 8th Engineer Brigade
12 (Force Support) Engineer Group
28 Engineer Regiment (United Kingdom) (Counter-Chemical, biological, radiological and nuclear defence)
32 Engineer Regiment
36 Engineer Regiment (Force Support)
39 Engineer Regiment (Air Support)
71 Engineer Regiment (paired with 39 Regiment)
75 Engineer Regiment (paired with 36 Regiment)
 29 (Explosive Ordnance Disposal & Search) Engineer Group
29 Explosive Ordnance Disposal and Search Group Support Unit
33 Engineer Regiment (EOD)
35 Engineer Regiment (EOD) - Formerly 35 Armoured Engineer Regiment
101 (City of London) Engineer Regiment (EOD & Search)  (Paired with 33 Regiment)
11 Explosive Ordnance Disposal and Search Regiment RLC
1 Military Working Dog Regiment
 170 (Infrastructure Support) Engineer Group
 42 Headquarters & Support Squadron
20 Works Group (Air Support)
 510 Specialist Team Royal Engineers (Airfields) (Army Reserve)
 529 Specialist Team Royal Engineers (Air Support)
 531 Specialist Team Royal Engineers (Airfields)
 532 Specialist Team Royal Engineers (Air Support)
 534 Specialist Team Royal Engineers (Airfields)
 62 Works Group
 508 Specialist Team Royal Engineers (Wks) (Army Reserve)
 519 Specialist Team Royal Engineers (Wks)
 522 Specialist Team Royal Engineers (Wks)
 523 Specialist Team Royal Engineers (Wks)
 524 Specialist Team Royal Engineers (Wks)
 63 Works Group
 517 Specialist Team Royal Engineers (Wks)
 518 Specialist Team Royal Engineers (Wks)
 525 Specialist Team Royal Engineers (Wks) (Army Reserve)
 527 Specialist Team Royal Engineers (Wks)
 535 Specialist Team Royal Engineers (Wks)
 65 Works Group (Army Reserve)
503 Specialist Team Royal Engineers (FP)
504 Specialist Team Royal Engineers (P)
506 Specialist Team Royal Engineers (W)
507 Specialist Team Royal Engineers (R)
509 Specialist Team Royal Engineers (PI)
526 Specialist Team Royal Engineers (Wks)
 66 Works Group  (Air Support)
502 Specialist Team Royal Engineers (FP)
516 Specialist Team Royal Engineers (BP)
521 Specialist Team Royal Engineers (WD)
528 Specialist Team Royal Engineers (P)
530 Specialist Team Royal Engineers (M)
25 (Close Support) Engineer Group
Royal Monmouthshire Royal Engineers (Militia)
21 Engineer Regiment
22 Engineer Regiment (supporting AI Brigade)
26 Engineer Regiment (supporting AI Brigade)

Regiments
Below is a list of the regiments of the Royal Engineers.

 See RSME below for 1 and 3 Regiments RSME
21 Engineer Regiment, at Claro Barracks, Ripon - Provides light role, close support engineering to the Adaptable Force.
 Regimental Headquarters
7 Headquarters and Support Squadron
1 Field Squadron
4 Field Squadron
23 Amphibious Engineer Squadron, in Sennelager (from 2021 to 2022 part of German-British Engineer Battalion 130 of the German Army)
29 Field Squadron
22 Engineer Regiment, at Swinton Barracks, Perham Down - Provides essential armoured engineering support to the British Army and 20th Armoured Brigade Combat Team & is equipped with some heavy duty capabilities, such as the Titan, Terrier and Trojan armoured vehicles. 
Regimental Headquarters
6 Headquarters and Support Squadron
3 Armoured Engineer Squadron
5 Armoured Engineer Squadron
52 Armoured Engineer Squadron
23 Parachute Engineer Regiment, at Rock Barracks, Woodbridge - Provides close and general engineer support to 16 Air Assault Brigade. The regiment is held at a very high state of readiness and regularly called upon to deploy on operations across the globe. Insertion is by parachute, helicopter or fixed wing aircraft.
Regimental Headquarters
12 (Nova Scotia) Headquarters and Support Squadron
9 Parachute Squadron
51 Parachute Squadron
299 Parachute Squadron, in Kingston upon Hull
 No. 1 Parachute Troop, in Kingston upon Hull
 No. 2 Parachute Troop, in Wakefield
 No. 2 Parachute Troop, in Pontefract
24 Commando Engineer Regiment, at RM Chivenor, Braunton - Provides combat engineering solutions to the very high readiness forces of 3 Commando Brigade Royal Marines. This includes the construction or destruction of fortifications, bridges and roads, the laying and clearing of mines and neutralizing IEDs. 
Regimental Headquarters
54 Commando Field Squadron
59 Commando Field Squadron
131 Commando Field Squadron, in Kingsbury, London
300 Troop, in Plymouth
301 Troop, in Sheldon
302 Troop, in Bath
26 Engineer Regiment, at Swinton Barracks, Perham Down - Provides armoured, combat, artisan and specialist engineering capabilities. They enable 12th Armoured Brigade Combat Team to live, move and fight. 
Regimental Headquarters
38 Headquarters and Support Squadron
8 Armoured Engineer Squadron
30 Armoured Engineer Squadron
33 Armoured Engineer Squadron
28 Engineer Regiment (Counter-Chemical, Biological, Radiological, and Nuclear (C-CBRN)) - Focuses on countering chemical, biological, radiological and nuclear (C-CBRN) hazards in the environment.
Regimental Headquarters, at RAF Honington, Honington
64 Headquarters and Support Squadron (C-CBRN), at RAF Honington, Honington
42 Field Squadron (C-CBRN), at Rock Barracks, Woodbridge
77 Field Squadron (C-CBRN), at Rock Barracks, Woodbridge
Falcon (Area Surveillance and Reconnaissance) Squadron, Royal Tank Regiment, at Harman Lines, Warminster Garrison
32 Engineer Regiment, at Marne Barracks, Catterick Garrison
Regimental Headquarters
2 Headquarters and Support Squadron
26 Field Squadron
31 Field Squadron
37 Field Squadron
33 Engineer Regiment (Explosive Ordnance Disposal and Search (EOD&S)), at Carver Barracks, Wimbish - Capable of providing advanced search and explosive ordnance disposal across the globe.
Regimental Headquarters
49 Field Squadron (EOD&S)
58 Field Squadron (EOD&S)
821 Field Squadron (EOD&S)
35 Engineer Regiment (Explosive Ordnance Disposal and Search (EOD&S)), at Carver Barracks, Wimbish - Capable of providing advanced search and explosive ordnance disposal across the globe.
Regimental Headquarters
15 Field Squadron (EOD&S)
17 Field Squadron (EOD&S)
21 Field Squadron (EOD&S)
36 Engineer Regiment (Queen's Gurkha Engineers), at Invicta Park Barracks, Maidstone
Regimental Headquarters – doubles as RHQ, Queen's Gurkha Engineers
50 Headquarters and Support Squadron
20 Field Squadron
69 (Gurkha) Field Squadron
70 (Gurkha) Field Squadron
61 Field Support Squadron, at Rock Barracks, Woodbridge
39 Engineer Regiment (Air Support), at Kinloss Barracks, Kinloss - The regiment provides Force Support engineering to both the Royal Air Force (RAF) and to the British Army. The lead air support squadron is equipped to offer specialist air support engineering as well as a composite of combat engineer and artisan trade skills making it a versatile, flexible and highly employable Force Support asset. Additionally, with the capabilities provided by the dive team, who are trained alongside the Royal Navy's divers, they can carry out underwater tasks such as reconnaissance, demolition, construction and concreting. 
Regimental Headquarters
60 Headquarters and Support Squadron (Air Support)
34 Field Squadron (Air Support)
48 Field Squadron (Air Support)
53 Field Squadron (Air Support)
65 Field Squadron (Air Support)
42 Engineer Regiment (Geographic), at RAF Wyton, Wyton - A specialist unit made up of military geographers and attached supporting elements. As a hybrid Regular and Reserve unit they provide geographic information, survey capabilities and mapping products. 
Regimental Headquarters and Special Support Team
13 Geographic Squadron
14 Geographic Squadron
16 Geographic Squadron
135 Geographic Squadron, in Ewell and Reading
 71 Engineer Regiment (Army Reserve) - Provides construction, plant and engineer logistic capability to support Air and Land components in the United Kingdom and globally.
 Regimental Headquarters at Leuchars Station
 102 (Clyde) Field Squadron, in Paisley and Barnsford Bridge
 103 (Tyne Electrical Engineers) Field Squadron, in Newcastle
 124 (Lowland) Field Support Squadron, in Cumbernauld, Leuchars, and Kinloss
 10 (Orkney) Troop, in Kirkwall
 591 (Antrim Artillery) Field Squadron, in Bangor, Northern Ireland
 75 Engineer Regiment (Army Reserve) - The British Army’s Logistic & Amphibious Bridging Engineers. The sapper reserves provide Force Support and deliver Logistic bridging capabilities globally.
 106 (West Riding) Field Squadron (V), at Bailey Barracks, Sheffield
 2 Troop, in Sheffield
 107 (Lancashire and Cheshire) Field Squadron, in Birkenhead
 202 Field Squadron, in Manchester
Manx Troop, in Douglas, Isle of Man
 101 (City of London) Engineer Regiment (EOD) (Army Reserve):
 217 Field Squadron (EOD), in Ilford and Southend)
 221 Field Squadron (EOD), in Bexleyheath and Catford)
 350 Field Squadron (EOD), in Chilwell and Chesterfield)
 579 Field Squadron (EOD), in Tunbridge Wells, Rochester and Redhill)
 Royal Monmouthshire Royal Engineers (Militia)
 Regimental Headquarters Troop, at Monmouth Castle
 100 Field Squadron, in Cwmbran, Bristol, Cardiff, and Swansea
 225 (City of Birmingham) Field Squadron, in Birmingham
 Jersey Field Squadron, in St Helier

All regiments also have a Light Aid Detachment (LAD) provided by Royal Electrical and Mechanical Engineers.

References

Citations

Bibliography